The men's 1500 metre freestyle event at the 2000 Summer Olympics took place on 22–23 September at the Sydney International Aquatic Centre in Sydney, Australia.

Australia's Grant Hackett denied his teammate and sentimental favourite Kieren Perkins a third straight title in the event. Having suffered badly over the first six days of the Games, Hackett maintained a strong lead from start to finish, and touched the wall first to claim a gold in 14:48.33. Perkins fought off a challenge against his newest rival in the middle of the program's longest race, but ended up only with a silver in 14:53.59, handing the entire medal haul for the host nation with a 1–2 finish. U.S. swimmer Chris Thompson came up with a spectacular swim to take the bronze in an American record of 14:56.81, holding off a fast-closing Alexei Filipets of Russia (14:56.88) by seven hundredths of a second (0.07). For the first time in Olympic history, all three medalists finished the race under a 15-minute barrier.

South Africa's dark horse Ryk Neethling powered home with a fifth-place effort in a new national record of 15:00.48, while American Erik Vendt, who previously set a continental mark from the trials, faded shortly to sixth in a time of 15:08.61. Ukraine's Igor Chervynskiy (15:08.80) and Germany's Heiko Hell (15:19.87) rounded out the finale.

Records
Prior to this competition, the existing world and Olympic records were as follows.

Results

Heats

Final

References

External links
Official Olympic Report

F
Men's events at the 2000 Summer Olympics